The Mix-Up is the seventh studio album by Beastie Boys, released on June 26, 2007. The album consists entirely of instrumental performances and won a Grammy Award for Best Pop Instrumental Album.

Background
On May 1, 2007, an e-mail sent to those on Beastie Boys' mailing list revealed the album is all instrumental.

On June 21, 2007, a legal stream of the entire album was released on BrooklynVegan.com. Drummer Mike D said that "even though The Mix-Up is a 'post-punk instrumental' album, the Beasties have no plans to ditch vocals for good. In fact, they are currently planning another version of the album that will feature collaborations with 'a pretty wide array' of 'mostly newer' vocalists." Two singers speculated to be featured on the vocal version were Jarvis Cocker and M.I.A.

In an interview with The Aquarian Weekly, published in February 2008, the band was asked if they were making a statement about the status of hip-hop music by releasing an album strictly of instrumentals. “In a way, the album was a reaction to our hip hop," said Ad-Rock "Our last record was an all rap record, so when we started recording [The Mix Up] we wanted to work with some instruments, and it just sounded cool, so we kept with it.”  Mike D expanded on Ad-Rock's response, adding, "We get asked, ‘What do you think of the state of hip hop today?’ a lot. Maybe I’m being defensive, but it seems like people always look for us to come out and criticize hip hop. But hip hop is what we grew up on, and it continues to be one of the only forms of music left that strives on evolution and innovation. Yeah, we might be in a spell where we’re waiting for that next record to come out and change everything—but still, that’s what hip hop is and that’s what puts it in its unique place.”

Critical reception

The album debuted at number 15 on the U.S. Billboard 200, selling 44,000 copies in its first week. It was their lowest charting album in the US. Uncut magazine gave it four stars out of five, saying "The Mix-Up is the best record collection ever thoroughly digested and re-imagined by a bunch of guys in love with sound." The Mix-Up won a Grammy in the Best Pop Instrumental category.

Track listing

Personnel
Beastie Boys
 Ad-Rock – guitars, producer, engineer, art direction
 MCA – bass guitar and upright basses, producer, engineer, art direction
 Mike D – drums, producer, engineer, art direction

Additional musicians
 Money Mark – clavinet, Rhodes, Farfisa
 Alfredo Ortiz – percussion

Technical
 Jon Weiner – engineer
 Greg Calbi – mastering
 Bill McMullen – illustration, package design

Charts

References

External links
 

2007 albums
Beastie Boys albums
Instrumental rock albums
Funk rock albums by American artists
Jazz-funk albums
Grammy Award for Best Contemporary Instrumental Album
Soul jazz albums